= Mohamed G. Gouda =

American computer scientist

Mohamed G. Gouda is an American computer scientist, currently the Mike A. Myers Centennial Professor at University of Texas at Austin.
